This is a list of victims of Nazism who were noted for their achievements. Many on the lists below were of Jewish and Polish origin, although Soviet POWs, Jehovah’s Witnesses, Serbs, Catholics, Roma and dissidents were also murdered. This list includes people from public life who, owing to their origins, their political or religious convictions, or their sexual orientation, were murdered by the Nazi regime. It includes those murdered in the Holocaust, as well as individuals otherwise killed by the Nazis during World War II. Those killed in concentration camps are listed alongside those who were murdered by the Nazi Party or those who chose suicide for political motives or to avoid being murdered.

The list is sorted by occupation and by nationality.

Performing arts

Literature and publishing

Visual arts and design

Music

Humanities

Mathematics

Natural sciences

Medicine and psychology

Law, business

Theology, spirituality, religion

Sports

Politics, resistance

Military

See also 
 List of Holocaust survivors
 List of authors banned in Nazi Germany
 List of victims and survivors of Auschwitz

References

External links
The Central Database of Shoah Victims' Names

 
N
Nazism